The Zanclean flood or Zanclean deluge is a flood theorized to have refilled the Mediterranean Sea 5.33 million years ago.
This flooding ended the Messinian salinity crisis and reconnected the Mediterranean Sea to the Atlantic Ocean, although it is possible that even before the flood there were partial connections to the Atlantic Ocean. The reconnection marks the beginning of the Zanclean age.

According to this model, water from the Atlantic Ocean refilled the dried up basin through the modern-day Strait of Gibraltar. The Mediterranean Basin flooded mostly during a period estimated to have been between several months and two years. Studies of the underground structures at the Gibraltar Strait show that the flooding channel descended gradually toward the bottom of the basin rather than forming a steep waterfall.

Background 

The geologic history of the Mediterranean is governed by plate tectonics involving the African Plate, the Arabian Plate and the Eurasian Plate which shrank the previously existing Tethys Ocean until its western part became the present-day Mediterranean.  For reasons not clearly established, during the latest Miocene the Mediterranean was severed from the Atlantic Ocean and partly dried up when the Guadalhorce and Rifian corridors that had previously connected the Mediterranean to the Atlantic closed, triggering the Messinian Salinity Crisis with the formation of thick salt deposits on the former seafloor and erosion of the continental slopes. The Nile and Rhône carved deep canyons during this time. Water levels in the Mediterranean during this time dropped by kilometres; the exact magnitude of the drop and whether it was symmetric between the Western Mediterranean and the Eastern Mediterranean is unclear; it is possible that interconnected seas remained on the floor of the Mediterranean.

The presence of Atlantic fish in Messinian deposits and the volume of salt deposited during the Messinian Salinity Crisis implies that there was some remnant flow from the Atlantic into the Mediterranean even before the Zanclean flood. Already before the Zanclean flood, increased precipitation and runoff had lowered the salinity of the remnant sea, with some water putatively originating in the Paratethys north of the Mediterranean.

Event 

The Zanclean flood occurred when the Strait of Gibraltar opened. Tectonic subsidence of the Gibraltar region may have lowered the sill until it breached. The exact triggering event is not known with certainty; faulting or sea level rise are debatable. The most widely accepted hypothesis is that a stream flowing into the Mediterranean eroded through the Strait of Gibraltar until it captured the Atlantic Ocean and that the Strait did not exist before this erosion event.

During the flood, a channel formed across the Strait of Gibraltar, which starts at the Camarinal Sill in the Strait of Gibraltar, splits around the Vizconde de Eza high of the Alboran Sea and eventually connects with the Alboran Channel before splitting into several branches that end in the  Algero-Balear basin. The channel has a U-like shape in its starting region, which is consistent with its formation during a giant flood. The sector of the Zanclean channel that passes through the Camarinal Sill may have a different origin, however.

Whether the Zanclean flood occurred gradually or as a catastrophic event is controversial. The magnitude of a catastrophic flood has been simulated by modelling. One single-dimensional model assumes a catastrophic flood of more than 10–100 sverdrup. Another estimate assumes that after the first breach of the sill, the flowing water eroded the threshold and formed the channel across the Gibraltar strait, increasing the flow of water which in turn increased the erosion until water levels rose enough in the Mediterranean to slow the flood.

This flood would have descended a relatively gentle ramp into the Mediterranean basin, not as a giant waterfall. The exact size of the flood is dependent on the pre-flood water levels in the Mediterranean and higher water levels there would result in a much smaller flood.

The flood affected only the Western Mediterranean at first, because the Sicily Sill (located at the present Straits of Sicily) formed a barrier separating its basin from the Eastern Mediterranean basin that probably overflowed through the Noto Canyon across the Malta Escarpment; in addition a sill may have existed in the eastern Alboran Sea at this time. While it was at first assumed that the filling of the eastern Mediterranean would have taken thousands of years, later estimates of the size of the Strait of Gibraltar channel implied that it would have taken much less, potentially less than a year until reconnection.

A large flood is not the only explanation for the reconnection of the Mediterranean with the Atlantic and concomitant environmental changes; more gradual reflooding of the Mediterranean including reflooding through other water sources is also possible. The absence of a catastrophic flooding event is supported by geological evidence found along the southern margin of the Alboran Sea.

Timing 

The timing of the Zanclean flood is uncertain, with one possibility being a flood around 5.33 million years ago; the end of the Messinian/Miocene and beginning of the Zanclean/Pliocene is usually associated with the flood. The main Zanclean flood may have been preceded by an earlier smaller flood event, and the presence of deep sea terraces has been used to infer that the refilling of the Mediterranean occurred in several pulses. Complete refilling of the Mediterranean may have taken about a decade.

Consequences 

The Zanclean flood created the Strait of Gibraltar; it is doubtful that tectonic or volcanic events could have created the strait since the main plate boundaries do not run through the strait and there is little seismic activity in its area. The narrowest part of the strait is located east of either sill, and it is considerably deeper than the sills. It is possible that these sills were formed after the flood through gravity-induced movement of neighbouring terrain.

The Zanclean flood caused a major change in the environment of the Mediterranean basin; the continental "Lago Mare" facies was replaced by Zanclean deep sea deposits. The flood may have affected global climate, considering that the much smaller flood triggered when Lake Agassiz drained did result in a cold period. The hypothesized remote effects reached as far as the Loyalty Ridge next to New Caledonia in the Southern Hemisphere.

The Zanclean flood resulted in the final isolation of numerous Mediterranean islands such as Crete, resulting in speciation of animals found there. On the other hand, the formation of the Gibraltar Strait prevented land animals from crossing over between Africa and Europe. Further the reconnection allowed sea animals such as cetaceans and their ancestors and pinnipeds to colonize the Mediterranean from the Atlantic.

Evidence of the flooding has been obtained on Zanclean-age sediments, both in boreholes and in sediments that were subsequently uplifted and raised above sea level. A sharp erosional surface separates the pre-Zanclean flood surface from the younger deposits, which are always marine in origin.

The waters flooding into the Western Mediterranean probably overspilled into the Ionian Sea through Sicily and the Noto submarine canyon offshore Avola; the spillover flood had a magnitude comparable to the flood in the Strait of Gibraltar. The rates at which the Mediterranean filled during the flood were more than enough to trigger substantial induced seismicity. Resulting large landslides would have sufficed at creating large tsunamis with wave heights reaching , evidence of which has been found in the Algeciras Basin. The infilling of the basin created tectonic stresses, which would have influenced the development of the Apennine Mountains.

Similar megafloods 

Similar floods have occurred elsewhere on Earth throughout history; examples include the Bonneville flood in North America, during which Lake Bonneville overflowed through Red Rock Pass into the Snake River Basin, and the Black Sea deluge hypothesis that postulates a flood from the Mediterranean into the Black Sea through the Bosporus.

See also 
 Black Sea deluge hypothesis – hypothetical flood scenario
 Outburst flood – high-magnitude, low-frequency catastrophic flood involving the sudden release of water
 Atlantropa, a proposed dam in the Strait of Gibraltar that would have partially reversed the effects of the Zanclean flood.

Notes

References

Inline citations

Sources

External links 

 
 

History of the Mediterranean
Mediterranean Sea
Megafloods
Messinian
Miocene Africa
Miocene Europe
Pliocene Africa
Pliocene Europe
Zanclean